Sankarapuram is a taluk of Kallakurichi district of the southern Indian state of Tamil Nadu. The headquarters of this taluk is Sankarapuram town.

External links 
 www.sankarapuram.do.am

Taluks of Kallakurichi district